Macbeth (full title The Tragedie of Macbeth) is a tragedy by William Shakespeare. It is thought to have been first performed in 1606. It dramatises the damaging physical and psychological effects of political ambition on those who seek power. Of all the plays that Shakespeare wrote during the reign of James I, Macbeth most clearly reflects his relationship with King James, patron of Shakespeare's acting company. It was first published in the Folio of 1623, possibly from a prompt book, and is Shakespeare's shortest tragedy.

A brave Scottish general named Macbeth receives a prophecy from a trio of witches that one day he will become King of Scotland. Consumed by ambition and spurred to action by his wife, Macbeth murders King Duncan and takes the Scottish throne for himself. He is then wracked with guilt and paranoia. Forced to commit more and more murders to protect himself from enmity and suspicion, he soon becomes a tyrannical ruler. The bloodbath and consequent civil war swiftly take Macbeth and Lady Macbeth into the realms of madness and death.

Shakespeare's source for the story is the account of Macbeth, King of Scotland, Macduff, and Duncan in Holinshed's Chronicles (1587), a history of England, Scotland, and Ireland familiar to Shakespeare and his contemporaries, although the events in the play differ extensively from the history of the real Macbeth. The events of the tragedy are usually associated with the execution of Henry Garnet for complicity in the Gunpowder Plot of 1605.

In the backstage world of theatre, some believe that the play is cursed, and will not mention its title aloud, referring to it instead as "The Scottish Play". The play has attracted some of the most renowned actors to the roles of Macbeth and Lady Macbeth, and has been adapted to film, television, opera, novels, comics, and other media.

Characters

 Duncanking of Scotland
 MalcolmDuncan's elder son
 DonalbainDuncan's younger son
 Macbetha general in the army of King Duncan; originally Thane of Glamis, then Thane of Cawdor, and later king of Scotland
 Lady MacbethMacbeth's wife, and later queen of Scotland
 BanquoMacbeth's friend and a general in the army of King Duncan
 FleanceBanquo's son
 MacduffThane of Fife
 Lady MacduffMacduff's wife
 Macduff's son
 Ross, Lennox, Angus, Menteith, CaithnessScottish thanes
 Siwardgeneral of the English forces
 Young SiwardSiward's son
 SeytonMacbeth's armourer
 Hecatequeen of the witches
 Three Witches
 Captainin the Scottish army
 Murderersemployed by Macbeth
 Third Murderer
 Portergatekeeper at Macbeth's home
 DoctorLady Macbeth's doctor
 Doctorat the English court
 GentlewomanLady Macbeth's caretaker
 Lordopposed to Macbeth
 First Apparitionarmed head
 Second Apparitionbloody child
 Third Apparitioncrowned child
 Attendants, Messengers, Servants, Soldiers

Plot

Act I

Amid thunder and lightning, Three Witches decide that their next meeting will be with Macbeth. In the following scene, a wounded sergeant reports to King Duncan of Scotland that his generals Banquo and Macbeth, the Thane of Glamis, have just defeated the allied forces of Norway and Ireland, who were led by the traitorous Macdonwald and the Thane of Cawdor. Macbeth, the King's kinsman, is praised for his bravery and fighting prowess.

In the following scene, Macbeth and Banquo discuss the weather and their victory. As they wander onto a heath, the Three Witches enter and greet them with prophecies. Though Banquo challenges them first, they address Macbeth, hailing him as "Thane of Glamis", "Thane of Cawdor", and that he will "be King hereafter". Macbeth appears to be stunned to silence. When Banquo asks of his own fortunes, the witches respond paradoxically, saying that he will be less than Macbeth, yet happier, and less successful, yet more. He will father a line of kings, though he himself will not be one. While the two men wonder at these pronouncements, the witches vanish, and another thane, Ross, arrives and informs Macbeth of his newly bestowed title: Thane of Cawdor. The first prophecy is thus fulfilled, and Macbeth, previously sceptical, immediately begins to harbour ambitions of becoming king.

King Duncan welcomes and praises Macbeth and Banquo, and Duncan declares that he will spend the night at Macbeth's castle at Inverness; Duncan also names his son Malcolm as his heir. Macbeth sends a message ahead to his wife, Lady Macbeth, telling her about the witches' prophecies. Lady Macbeth suffers none of her husband's uncertainty and wishes him to murder Duncan in order to obtain kingship. When Macbeth arrives at Inverness, she overrides all of her husband's objections by challenging his manhood and successfully persuades him to kill the king that very night. He and Lady Macbeth plan to get Duncan's two chamberlains drunk so that they will black out; the next morning they will frame the chamberlains for the murder. Since the chamberlains would remember nothing whatsoever, they would be blamed for the deed.

Act II

While Duncan is asleep, Macbeth stabs him, despite his doubts and a number of supernatural portents, including a hallucination of a bloody dagger. He is so shaken that Lady Macbeth has to take charge. In accordance with her plan, she frames Duncan's sleeping servants for the murder by placing bloody daggers on them. Early the next morning, Lennox, a Scottish nobleman, and Macduff, the loyal Thane of Fife, arrive. A porter opens the gate and Macbeth leads them to the king's chamber, where Macduff discovers Duncan's body. Macbeth murders the guards to prevent them from professing their innocence, but claims he did so in a fit of anger over their misdeeds. Duncan's sons Malcolm and Donalbain flee to England and Ireland, respectively, fearing that whoever killed Duncan desires their demise as well. The rightful heirs' flight makes them suspects and Macbeth assumes the throne as the new King of Scotland as a kinsman of the dead king. Banquo reveals this to the audience, and while sceptical of the new King Macbeth, he remembers the witches' prophecy about how his own descendants would inherit the throne; this makes him suspicious of Macbeth.

Act III

Despite his success, Macbeth, also aware of this part of the prophecy, remains uneasy. Macbeth invites Banquo to a royal banquet, where he discovers that Banquo and his young son, Fleance, will be riding out that night. Fearing Banquo's suspicions, Macbeth arranges to have him murdered, by hiring two men to kill them, later sending a third murderer, presumably to ensure that the deed is completed. The assassins succeed in killing Banquo, but Fleance escapes. Macbeth becomes furious: he fears that his power remains insecure as long as an heir of Banquo remains alive.

At the banquet, Macbeth invites his lords and Lady Macbeth to a night of drinking and merriment. Banquo's ghost enters and sits in Macbeth's place. Macbeth raves fearfully, startling his guests, as the ghost is visible only to him. The others panic at the sight of Macbeth raging at an empty chair, until a desperate Lady Macbeth tells them that her husband is merely afflicted with a familiar and harmless malady. The ghost departs and returns once more, causing the same riotous anger and fear in Macbeth. This time, Lady Macbeth tells the visitors to leave, and they do so. At the end Hecate scolds the three weird sisters for helping Macbeth, especially without consulting her. Hecate instructs the Witches to give Macbeth false security. Note that some scholars believe the Hecate scene was added in later.

Act IV

Macbeth, disturbed, visits the three witches once more and asks them to reveal the truth of their prophecies to him. To answer his questions, they summon horrible apparitions, each of which offers predictions and further prophecies to put Macbeth's fears at rest. First, they conjure an armoured head, which tells him to beware of Macduff (IV.i.72). Second, a bloody child tells him that no one born of a woman will be able to harm him. Thirdly, a crowned child holding a tree states that Macbeth will be safe until Great Birnam Wood comes to Dunsinane Hill. Macbeth is relieved and feels secure because he knows that all men are born of women and forests cannot possibly move.

Macbeth also asks whether Banquo's sons will ever reign in Scotland, to which the witches conjure a procession of eight crowned kings, all similar in appearance to Banquo, and the last carrying a mirror that reflects even more kings. Macbeth realises that these are all Banquo's descendants having acquired kingship in numerous countries.

After the witches perform a mad dance and leave, Lennox enters and tells Macbeth that Macduff has fled to England. Macbeth orders Macduff's castle be seized, and, most cruelly, sends murderers to slaughter Macduff, as well as Macduff's wife and children. Although Macduff is no longer in the castle, everyone in Macduff's castle is put to death, including Lady Macduff and their young son.

Act V

Lady Macbeth becomes racked with guilt from the crimes she and her husband have committed. At night, in the king's palace at Dunsinane, a doctor and a gentlewoman discuss Lady Macbeth's strange habit of sleepwalking. Suddenly, Lady Macbeth enters in a trance with a candle in her hand. Bemoaning the murders of Duncan, Lady Macduff, and Banquo, she tries to wash off imaginary bloodstains from her hands, all the while speaking of the terrible things she knows she pressed her husband to do. She leaves, and the doctor and gentlewoman marvel at her descent into madness.

In England, Macduff is informed by Ross that his "castle is surprised; wife and babes / Savagely slaughter'd" (IV.iii.204–205). When this news of his family's execution reaches him, Macduff is stricken with grief and vows revenge. Prince Malcolm, Duncan's son, has succeeded in raising an army in England, and Macduff joins him as he rides to Scotland to challenge Macbeth's forces. The invasion has the support of the Scottish nobles, who are appalled and frightened by Macbeth's tyrannical and murderous behaviour. Malcolm leads an army, along with Macduff and Englishmen Siward (the Elder), the Earl of Northumberland, against Dunsinane Castle. While encamped in Birnam Wood, the soldiers are ordered to cut down and carry tree branches to camouflage their numbers.

Before Macbeth's opponents arrive, he receives news that Lady Macbeth has killed herself, causing him to sink into a deep and pessimistic despair and deliver his "To-morrow, and to-morrow, and to-morrow" soliloquy (V.v.17–28). Though he reflects on the brevity and meaninglessness of life, he nevertheless awaits the English and fortifies Dunsinane. He is certain that the witches' prophecies guarantee his invincibility, but is struck with fear when he learns that the English army is advancing on Dunsinane shielded with boughs cut from Birnam Wood, in apparent fulfillment of one of the prophecies.

A battle culminates in Macduff's confrontation with Macbeth, who kills Young Siward in combat. The English forces overwhelm his army and castle. Macbeth boasts that he has no reason to fear Macduff, for he cannot be killed by any man born of woman. Macduff declares that he was "from his mother's womb / Untimely ripp'd" (V.8.15–16), (i.e., born by Caesarean section and not a natural birth) and is not "of woman born", fulfilling the second prophecy. Macbeth realises too late that he has misinterpreted the witches' words. Though he realises that he is doomed, and despite Macduff urging him to yield, he is unwilling to surrender and continues fighting. Macduff kills and beheads him, thus fulfilling the remaining prophecy.

Macduff carries Macbeth's head onstage and Malcolm discusses how order has been restored. His last reference to Lady Macbeth, however, reveals tis thought, by self and violent hands / Took off her life" (V.ix.71–72), but the method of her suicide is undisclosed. Malcolm, now the King of Scotland, declares his benevolent intentions for the country and invites all to see him crowned at Scone.

(Although Malcolm, and not Fleance, is placed on the throne, the witches' prophecy concerning Banquo ("Thou shalt get kings") was known to the audience of Shakespeare's time to be true: James VI of Scotland (later also James I of England) was supposedly a descendant of Banquo.)

Sources

A principal source comes from the Daemonologie of King James published in 1597 which included a news pamphlet titled Newes from Scotland that detailed the famous North Berwick witch trials of 1590. The publication of Daemonologie came just a few years before the tragedy of Macbeth with the themes and setting in a direct and comparative contrast with King James' personal obsessions with witchcraft, which developed following his conclusion that the stormy weather that threatened his passage from Denmark to Scotland was a targeted attack. Not only did the subsequent trials take place in Scotland, the women accused were recorded, under torture, of having conducted rituals with the same mannerisms as the three witches. One of the evidenced passages is referenced when the women under trial confessed to attempt the use of witchcraft to raise a tempest and sabotage the boat King James and his queen were on board during their return trip from Denmark. The three witches discuss the raising of winds at sea in the opening lines of Act 1 Scene 3.

Macbeth has been compared to Shakespeare's Antony and Cleopatra. As characters, both Antony and Macbeth seek a new world, even at the cost of the old one. Both fight for a throne and have a 'nemesis' to face to achieve that throne. For Antony, the nemesis is Octavius; for Macbeth, it is Banquo. At one point Macbeth even compares himself to Antony, saying "under Banquo / My Genius is rebuk'd, as it is said / Mark Antony's was by Caesar." Lastly, both plays contain powerful and manipulative female figures: Cleopatra and Lady Macbeth.

Shakespeare borrowed the story from several tales in Holinshed's Chronicles, a popular history of the British Isles well known to Shakespeare and his contemporaries. In Chronicles, a man named Donwald finds several of his family put to death by his king, Duff, for dealing with witches. After being pressured by his wife, he and four of his servants kill the king in his own house. In Chronicles, Macbeth is portrayed as struggling to support the kingdom in the face of King Duncan's ineptitude. He and Banquo meet the three witches, who make exactly the same prophecies as in Shakespeare's version. Macbeth and Banquo then together plot the murder of Duncan, at Lady Macbeth's urging. Macbeth has a long, ten-year reign before eventually being overthrown by Macduff and Malcolm. The parallels between the two versions are clear. However, some scholars think that George Buchanan's Rerum Scoticarum Historia matches Shakespeare's version more closely. Buchanan's work was available in Latin in Shakespeare's day.

No medieval account of the reign of Macbeth mentions the Weird Sisters, Banquo, or Lady Macbeth, and with the exception of the latter none actually existed. The characters of Banquo, the Weird Sisters, and Lady Macbeth were first mentioned in 1527 by a Scottish historian Hector Boece in his book Historia Gentis Scotorum (History of the Scottish People) who wanted to denigrate Macbeth in order to strengthen the claim of the House of Stewart to the Scottish throne. Boece portrayed Banquo as an ancestor of the Stewart kings of Scotland, adding in a "prophecy" that the descendants of Banquo would be the rightful kings of Scotland while the Weird Sisters served to give a picture of King Macbeth as gaining the throne via dark supernatural forces. Macbeth did have a wife, but it is not clear if she was as power-hungry and ambitious as Boece portrayed her, which served his purpose of having even Macbeth realise he lacked a proper claim to the throne, and only took it at the urging of his wife. Holinshed accepted Boece's version of Macbeth's reign at face value and included it in his Chronicles. Shakespeare saw the dramatic possibilities in the story as related by Holinshed, and used it as the basis for the play.

No other version of the story has Macbeth kill the king in Macbeth's own castle. Scholars have seen this change of Shakespeare's as adding to the darkness of Macbeth's crime as the worst violation of hospitality. Versions of the story that were common at the time had Duncan being killed in an ambush at Inverness, not in a castle. Shakespeare conflated the story of Donwald and King Duff in what was a significant change to the story.

Shakespeare made another important change. In Chronicles, Banquo is an accomplice in Macbeth's murder of King Duncan, and plays an important part in ensuring that Macbeth, not Malcolm, takes the throne in the coup that follows. In Shakespeare's day, Banquo was thought to be an ancestor of the Stuart King James I. (In the 19th century it was established that Banquo is an unhistorical character, the Stuarts are actually descended from a Breton family which migrated to Scotland slightly later than Macbeth's time.) The Banquo portrayed in earlier sources is significantly different from the Banquo created by Shakespeare. Critics have proposed several reasons for this change. First, to portray the king's ancestor as a murderer would have been risky. Other authors of the time who wrote about Banquo, such as Jean de Schelandre in his Stuartide, also changed history by portraying Banquo as a noble man, not a murderer, probably for the same reasons. Second, Shakespeare may have altered Banquo's character simply because there was no dramatic need for another accomplice to the murder; there was, however, a need to give a dramatic contrast to Macbeth—a role which many scholars argue is filled by Banquo.

Other scholars maintain that a strong argument can be made for associating the tragedy with the Gunpowder Plot of 1605. As presented by Harold Bloom in 2008: "[S]cholars cite the existence of several topical references in Macbeth to the events of that year, namely the execution of the Father Henry Garnett for his alleged complicity in the Gunpowder Plot of 1605, as referenced in the porter's scene." Those arrested for their role in the Gunpowder Plot refused to give direct answers to the questions posed to them by their interrogators, which reflected the influence of the Jesuit practice of equivocation. Shakespeare, by having Macbeth say that demons "palter...in a double sense" and "keep the promise to our ear/And break it to our hope", confirmed James's belief that equivocation was a "wicked" practice, which reflected in turn the "wickedness" of the Catholic Church. Garnett had in his possession A Treatise on Equivocation, and in the play the Weird Sisters often engage in equivocation, for instance telling Macbeth that he could never be overthrown until "Great Birnan wood to high Dunsinane hill/Shall Come". Macbeth interprets the prophecy as meaning never, but in fact, the Three Sisters refer only to branches of the trees of Great Birnam coming to Dunsinane hill. The inspiration for this prophecy may have originated with the Battle of Droizy; both that Battle and Macbeth may have, in turn, inspired J. R. R. Tolkien's tree herders, the Ents in his novels The Lord of the Rings.

Date and text

Macbeth cannot be dated precisely, but it is usually taken to be contemporaneous to the other canonical tragedies: Hamlet, Othello, and King Lear. While some scholars have placed the original writing of the play as early as 1599, most believe that the play is unlikely to have been composed earlier than 1603 as the play is widely seen to celebrate King James' ancestors and the Stuart accession to the throne in 1603 (James believed himself to be descended from Banquo), suggesting that the parade of eight kings—which the witches show Macbeth in a vision in Act IV—is a compliment to King James. Many scholars think the play was written in 1606 in the aftermath of the Gunpowder Plot, citing possible internal allusions to the 1605 plot and its ensuing trials. In fact, there are a great number of allusions and possible pieces of evidence alluding to the Plot, and, for this reason, a great many critics agree that Macbeth was written in the year 1606. Lady Macbeth's instructions to her husband, "Look like the innocent flower, but be the serpent under't" (1.5.74–75), may be an allusion to a medal that was struck in 1605 to commemorate King James' escape that depicted a serpent hiding among lilies and roses.

Particularly, the Porter's speech (2.3.1–21) in which he welcomes an "equivocator", a farmer, and a tailor to hell (2.3.8–13), has been argued to be an allusion to the 28 March 1606 trial and execution on 3 May 1606 of the Jesuit Henry Garnet, who used the alias "Farmer", with "equivocator" referring to Garnet's defence of "equivocation". The porter says that the equivocator "committed treason enough for God's sake" (2.3.9–10), which specifically connects equivocation and treason and ties it to the Jesuit belief that equivocation was only lawful when used "for God's sake", strengthening the allusion to Garnet. The porter goes on to say that the equivocator "yet could not equivocate to heaven" (2.3.10–11), echoing grim jokes that were current on the eve of Garnet's execution: i.e. that Garnet would be "hanged without equivocation" and at his execution he was asked "not to equivocate with his last breath". The "English tailor" the porter admits to hell (2.3.13), has been seen as an allusion to Hugh Griffin, a tailor who was questioned by the Archbishop of Canterbury on 27 November and 3 December 1607 for the part he played in Garnet's "miraculous straw", an infamous head of straw that was stained with Garnet's blood that had congealed into a form resembling Garnet's portrait, which was hailed by Catholics as a miracle. The tailor Griffin became notorious and the subject of verses published with his portrait on the title page.

When James became king of England, a feeling of uncertainty settled over the nation. James was a Scottish king and the son of Mary, Queen of Scots, a staunch Catholic and English traitor. In the words of critic Robert Crawford, "Macbeth was a play for a post-Elizabethan England facing up to what it might mean to have a Scottish king. England seems comparatively benign, while its northern neighbour is mired in a bloody, monarch-killing past. ... Macbeth may have been set in medieval Scotland, but it was filled with material of interest to England and England's ruler." Critics argue that the content of the play is clearly a message to James, the new Scottish King of England. Likewise, the critic Andrew Hadfield noted the contrast the play draws between the saintly King Edward the Confessor of England who has the power of the royal touch to cure scrofula and whose realm is portrayed as peaceful and prosperous vs. the bloody chaos of Scotland. James in his 1598 book The Trew Law of Free Monarchies had asserted that kings are always right, if not just, and his subjects owe him total loyalty at all times, writing that even if a king is a tyrant, his subjects must never rebel and just endure his tyranny for their own good. James had argued that the tyranny was preferable to the problems caused by rebellion which were even worse; Shakespeare by contrast in Macbeth argued for the right of the subjects to overthrow a tyrant king, in what appeared to be an implied criticism of James's theories if applied to England. Hadfield also noted a curious aspect of the play in that it implies that primogeniture is the norm in Scotland, but Duncan has to nominate his son Malcolm to be his successor while Macbeth is accepted without protest by the Scottish lairds as their king despite being an usurper. Hadfield argued this aspect of the play with the thanes apparently choosing their king was a reference to the Stuart claim to the English throne, and the attempts of the English Parliament to block the succession of James's Catholic mother, Mary, Queen of Scots, from succeeding to the English throne. Hadfield argued that Shakespeare implied that James was indeed the rightful king of England, but owed his throne not to divine favour as James would have it, but rather due to the willingness of the English Parliament to accept the Protestant son of the Catholic Mary, Queen of Scots, as their king.

Garry Wills provides further evidence that Macbeth is a Gunpowder Play (a type of play that emerged immediately following the events of the Gunpowder Plot). He points out that every Gunpowder Play contains "a necromancy scene, regicide attempted or completed, references to equivocation, scenes that test loyalty by use of deceptive language, and a character who sees through plots—along with a vocabulary similar to the Plot in its immediate aftermath (words like train, blow, vault) and an ironic recoil of the Plot upon the Plotters (who fall into the pit they dug)."

The play utilizes a few key words that the audience at the time would recognize as allusions to the Plot. In one sermon in 1605, Lancelot Andrewes stated, regarding the failure of the Plotters on God's day, "Be they fair or foul, glad or sad (as the poet calleth Him) the great Diespiter, 'the Father of days' hath made them both." Shakespeare begins the play by using the words "fair" and "foul" in the first speeches of the witches and Macbeth. In the words of Jonathan Gil Harris, the play expresses the "horror unleashed by a supposedly loyal subject who seeks to kill a king and the treasonous role of equivocation. The play even echoes certain keywords from the scandal—the 'vault' beneath the House of Parliament in which Guy Fawkes stored thirty kegs of gunpowder and the 'blow' about which one of the conspirators had secretly warned a relative who planned to attend the House of Parliament on 5 November...Even though the Plot is never alluded to directly, its presence is everywhere in the play, like a pervasive odor."

Scholars also cite an entertainment seen by King James at Oxford in the summer of 1605 that featured three "sibyls" like the weird sisters; Kermode surmises that Shakespeare could have heard about this and alluded to it with the weird sisters. However, A. R. Braunmuller in the New Cambridge edition finds the 1605–06 arguments inconclusive, and argues only for an earliest date of 1603.

One suggested allusion supporting a date in late 1606 is the first witch's dialogue about a sailor's wife: "'Aroint thee, witch!' the rump-fed ronyon cries./Her husband's to Aleppo gone, master o' the Tiger" (1.3.6–7). This has been thought to allude to the Tiger, a ship that returned to England 27 June 1606 after a disastrous voyage in which many of the crew were killed by pirates. A few lines later the witch speaks of the sailor, "He shall live a man forbid:/Weary se'nnights nine times nine" (1.3.21–22). The real ship was at sea 567 days, the product of 7x9x9, which has been taken as a confirmation of the allusion, which if correct, confirms that the witch scenes were either written or amended later than July 1606.

The play is not considered to have been written any later than 1607, since, as Kermode notes, there are "fairly clear allusions to the play in 1607". One notable reference is in Francis Beaumont's Knight of the Burning Pestle, first performed in 1607. The following lines (Act V, Scene 1, 24–30) are, according to scholars, a clear allusion to the scene in which Banquo's ghost haunts Macbeth at the dinner table:

When thou art at thy table with thy friends,
Merry in heart, and filled with swelling wine,
I'll come in midst of all thy pride and mirth,
Invisible to all men but thyself,
And whisper such a sad tale in thine ear
Shall make thee let the cup fall from thy hand,
And stand as mute and pale as death itself.

Macbeth was first printed in the First Folio of 1623 and the Folio is the only source for the text. Some scholars contend that the Folio text was abridged and rearranged from an earlier manuscript or prompt book. Often cited as interpolation are stage cues for two songs, whose lyrics are not included in the Folio but are included in Thomas Middleton's play The Witch, which was written between the accepted date for Macbeth (1606) and the printing of the Folio. Many scholars believe these songs were editorially inserted into the Folio, though whether they were Middleton's songs or preexisting songs is not certain. It is also widely believed that the character of Hecate, as well as some lines of the First Witch (4.1 124–131), were not part of Shakespeare's original play but were added by the Folio editors and possibly written by Middleton, though "there is no completely objective proof" of such interpolation.

Themes and motifs

Macbeth is an anomaly among Shakespeare's tragedies in certain critical ways. It is short: more than a thousand lines shorter than Othello and King Lear, and only slightly more than half as long as Hamlet. This brevity has suggested to many critics that the received version is based on a heavily cut source, perhaps a prompt-book for a particular performance. This would reflect other Shakespeare plays existing in both Quarto and the Folio, where the Quarto versions are usually longer than the Folio versions. Macbeth was first printed in the First Folio, but has no Quarto version – if there were a Quarto, it would probably be longer than the Folio version. That brevity has also been connected to other unusual features: the fast pace of the first act, which has seemed to be "stripped for action"; the comparative flatness of the characters other than Macbeth; and the oddness of Macbeth himself compared with other Shakespearean tragic heroes. A. C. Bradley, in considering this question, concluded the play "always was an extremely short one", noting the witch scenes and battle scenes would have taken up some time in performance, remarking, "I do not think that, in reading, we feel Macbeth to be short: certainly we are astonished when we hear it is about half as long as Hamlet. Perhaps in the Shakespearean theatre too it seemed to occupy a longer time than the clock recorded."

As a tragedy of character
At least since the days of Alexander Pope and Samuel Johnson, analysis of the play has centred on the question of Macbeth's ambition, commonly seen as so dominant a trait that it defines the character. Johnson asserted that Macbeth, though esteemed for his military bravery, is wholly reviled.

This opinion recurs in critical literature, and, according to Caroline Spurgeon, is supported by Shakespeare himself, who apparently intended to degrade his hero by vesting him with clothes unsuited to him and to make Macbeth look ridiculous by several exaggerations he applies: his garments seem either too big or too small for him – as his ambition is too big and his character too small for his new and unrightful role as king. When he feels as if "dressed in borrowed robes", after his new title as Thane of Cawdor, prophesied by the witches, has been confirmed by Ross (I, 3, ll. 108–109), Banquo comments: "New honours come upon him,Like our strange garments, cleave not to their mould,But with the aid of use" (I, 3, ll. 145–146). And, at the end, when the tyrant is at bay at Dunsinane, Caithness sees him as a man trying in vain to fasten a large garment on him with too small a belt: "He cannot buckle his distemper'd cause  Within the belt of rule" (V, 2, ll. 14–15) while Angus sums up what everybody thinks ever since Macbeth's accession to power: "now does he feel his title  Hang loose about him, like a giant's robe  upon a dwarfish thief" (V, 2, ll. 18–20).

Like Richard III, but without that character's perversely appealing exuberance, Macbeth wades through blood until his inevitable fall. As Kenneth Muir writes, "Macbeth has not a predisposition to murder; he has merely an inordinate ambition that makes murder itself seem to be a lesser evil than failure to achieve the crown." Some critics, such as E. E. Stoll, explain this characterisation as a holdover from Senecan or medieval tradition. Shakespeare's audience, in this view, expected villains to be wholly bad, and Senecan style, far from prohibiting a villainous protagonist, all but demanded it.

Yet for other critics, it has not been so easy to resolve the question of Macbeth's motivation. Robert Bridges, for instance, perceived a paradox: a character able to express such convincing horror before Duncan's murder would likely be incapable of committing the crime. For many critics, Macbeth's motivations in the first act appear vague and insufficient. John Dover Wilson hypothesised that Shakespeare's original text had an extra scene or scenes where husband and wife discussed their plans. This interpretation is not fully provable; however, the motivating role of ambition for Macbeth is universally recognised. The evil actions motivated by his ambition seem to trap him in a cycle of increasing evil, as Macbeth himself recognises: "I am in bloodStepp'd in so far that, should I wade no more, Returning were as tedious as go o'er."

While working on Russian translations of Shakespeare's works, Boris Pasternak compared Macbeth to Raskolnikov, the protagonist of Crime and Punishment by Fyodor Dostoevsky. Pasternak argues that "neither Macbeth or Raskolnikov is a born criminal or a villain by nature. They are turned into criminals by faulty rationalizations, by deductions from false premises." He goes on to argue that Lady Macbeth is "feminine ... one of those active, insistent wives" who becomes her husband's "executive, more resolute and consistent than he is himself". According to Pasternak, she is only helping Macbeth carry out his own wishes, to her own detriment.

As a tragedy of moral order

The disastrous consequences of Macbeth's ambition are not limited to him. Almost from the moment of the murder, the play depicts Scotland as a land shaken by inversions of the natural order. Shakespeare may have intended a reference to the great chain of being, although the play's images of disorder are mostly not specific enough to support detailed intellectual readings. He may also have intended an elaborate compliment to James's belief in the divine right of kings, although this hypothesis, outlined at greatest length by Henry N. Paul, is not universally accepted. As in Julius Caesar, though, perturbations in the political sphere are echoed and even amplified by events in the material world. Among the most often depicted of the inversions of the natural order is sleep. Macbeth's announcement that he has "murdered sleep" is figuratively mirrored in Lady Macbeth's sleepwalking.

Macbeths generally accepted indebtedness to medieval tragedy is often seen as significant in the play's treatment of moral order. Glynne Wickham connects the play, through the Porter, to a mystery play on the harrowing of hell. Howard Felperin argues that the play has a more complex attitude toward "orthodox Christian tragedy" than is often admitted; he sees a kinship between the play and the tyrant plays within the medieval liturgical drama.

The theme of androgyny is often seen as a special aspect of the theme of disorder. Inversion of normative gender roles is most famously associated with the witches and with Lady Macbeth as she appears in the first act. Whatever Shakespeare's degree of sympathy with such inversions, the play ends with a thorough return to normative gender values. Some feminist psychoanalytic critics, such as Janet Adelman, have connected the play's treatment of gender roles to its larger theme of inverted natural order. In this light, Macbeth is punished for his violation of the moral order by being removed from the cycles of nature (which are figured as female); nature itself (as embodied in the movement of Birnam Wood) is part of the restoration of moral order.

As a poetic tragedy
Critics in the early twentieth century reacted against what they saw as an excessive dependence on the study of character in criticism of the play. This dependence, though most closely associated with Andrew Cecil Bradley, is clear as early as the time of Mary Cowden Clarke, who offered precise, if fanciful, accounts of the predramatic lives of Shakespeare's female leads. She suggested, for instance, that the child Lady Macbeth refers to in the first act died during a foolish military action.

Witchcraft and evil

In the play, the Three Witches represent darkness, chaos, and conflict, while their role is as agents and witnesses. Their presence communicates treason and impending doom. During Shakespeare's day, witches were seen as worse than rebels, "the most notorious traytor and rebell that can be". They were not only political traitors, but spiritual traitors as well. Much of the confusion that springs from them comes from their ability to straddle the play's borders between reality and the supernatural. They are so deeply entrenched in both worlds that it is unclear whether they control fate, or whether they are merely its agents. They defy logic, not being subject to the rules of the real world. The witches' lines in the first act: "Fair is foul, and foul is fair: Hover through the fog and filthy air" are often said to set the tone for the rest of the play by establishing a sense of confusion. Indeed, the play is filled with situations where evil is depicted as good, while good is rendered evil. The line "Double, double toil and trouble," communicates the witches' intent clearly: they seek only trouble for the mortals around them. The witches' spells are remarkably similar to the spells of the witch Medusa in Anthony Munday's play Fidele and Fortunio published in 1584, and Shakespeare may have been influenced by these.

While the witches do not tell Macbeth directly to kill King Duncan, they use a subtle form of temptation when they tell Macbeth that he is destined to be king. By placing this thought in his mind, they effectively guide him on the path to his own destruction. This follows the pattern of temptation used at the time of Shakespeare. First, they argued, a thought is put in a man's mind, then the person may either indulge in the thought or reject it. Macbeth indulges in it, while Banquo rejects.

According to J. A. Bryant Jr., Macbeth also makes use of Biblical parallels, notably between King Duncan's murder and the murder of Christ:

Superstition and "The Scottish Play"

While many today would say that any misfortune surrounding a production is mere coincidence, actors and others in the theatre industry often consider it bad luck to mention Macbeth by name while inside a theatre, and sometimes refer to it indirectly, for example as "The Scottish Play", or "MacBee", or when referring to the characters and not the play, "Mr. and Mrs. M", or "The Scottish King".

This is because Shakespeare (or the play's revisers) is said to have used the spells of real witches in his text, purportedly angering the witches and causing them to curse the play. Thus, to say the name of the play inside a theatre is believed to doom the production to failure, and perhaps cause physical injury or death to cast members. There are stories of accidents, misfortunes and even deaths taking place during runs of Macbeth.

According to the actor Sir Donald Sinden, in his Sky Arts TV series Great West End Theatres, contrary to popular myth, Shakespeare's tragedy Macbeth is not the unluckiest play as superstition likes to portray it. Exactly the opposite! The origin of the unfortunate moniker dates back to repertory theatre days when each town and village had at least one theatre to entertain the public. If a play was not doing well, it would invariably get 'pulled' and replaced with a sure-fire audience pleaser – Macbeth guaranteed full-houses. So when the weekly theatre newspaper, The Stage was published, listing what was on in each theatre in the country, it was instantly noticed what shows had not worked the previous week, as they had been replaced by a definite crowd-pleaser. More actors have died during performances of Hamlet than in the "Scottish play" as the profession still calls it. It is forbidden to quote from it backstage as this could cause the current play to collapse and have to be replaced, causing possible unemployment.

Several methods exist to dispel the curse, depending on the actor. One, attributed to Michael York, is to immediately leave the building the stage is in with the person who uttered the name, walk around it three times, spit over their left shoulders, say an obscenity then wait to be invited back into the building. A related practice is to spin around three times as fast as possible on the spot, sometimes accompanied by spitting over their shoulder, and uttering an obscenity. Another popular "ritual" is to leave the room, knock three times, be invited in, and then quote a line from Hamlet. Yet another is to recite lines from The Merchant of Venice, thought to be a lucky play.

Sir Patrick Stewart, on the radio program Ask Me Another, asserted "if you have played the role of the Scottish thane, then you are allowed to say the title, any time anywhere".

Performance history

Shakespeare's day to the Interregnum
The only eyewitness account of Macbeth in Shakespeare's lifetime was recorded by Simon Forman, who saw a performance at the Globe on 20 April 1610. Scholars have noted discrepancies between Forman's account and the play as it appears in the Folio. For example, he makes no mention of the apparition scene, or of Hecate, of the man not of woman born, or of Birnam Wood. However, Clark observes that Forman's accounts were often inaccurate and incomplete (for instance omitting the statue scene from The Winter's Tale) and his interest did not seem to be in "giving full accounts of the productions".

As mentioned above, the Folio text is thought by some to be an alteration of the original play. This has led to the theory that the play as we know it from the Folio was an adaptation for indoor performance at the Blackfriars Theatre (which was operated by the King's Men from 1608) – and even speculation that it represents a specific performance before King James. The play contains more musical cues than any other play in the canon as well as a significant use of sound effects.

Restoration and eighteenth century

All theatres were closed down by the Puritan government on 6 September 1642. Upon the restoration of the monarchy in 1660, two patent companies (the King's Company and the Duke's Company) were established, and the existing theatrical repertoire divided between them. Sir William Davenant, founder of the Duke's Company, adapted Shakespeare's play to the tastes of the new era, and his version would dominate on stage for around eighty years. Among the changes he made were the expansion of the role of the witches, introducing new songs, dances and 'flying', and the expansion of the role of Lady Macduff as a foil to Lady Macbeth. There were, however, performances outside the patent companies: among the evasions of the Duke's Company's monopoly was a puppet version of Macbeth.

Macbeth was a favourite of the seventeenth-century diarist Samuel Pepys, who saw the play on 5 November 1664 ("admirably acted"), 28 December 1666 ("most excellently acted"), ten days later on 7 January 1667 ("though I saw it lately, yet [it] appears a most excellent play in all respects"), on 19 April 1667 ("one of the best plays for a stage ... that ever I saw"), again on 16 October 1667 ("was vexed to see Young, who is but a bad actor at best, act Macbeth in the room of Betterton, who, poor man! is sick"), and again three weeks later on 6 November 1667 ("[at] Macbeth, which we still like mightily"), yet again on 12 August 1668 ("saw Macbeth, to our great content"), and finally on 21 December 1668, on which date the king and court were also present in the audience.

The first professional performances of Macbeth in North America were probably those of The Hallam Company.

In 1744, David Garrick revived the play, abandoning Davenant's version and instead advertising it "as written by Shakespeare". In fact this claim was largely false: he retained much of Davenant's more popular business for the witches, and himself wrote a lengthy death speech for Macbeth. And he cut more than 10% of Shakespeare's play, including the drunken porter, the murder of Lady Macduff's son, and Malcolm's testing of Macduff. Hannah Pritchard was his greatest stage partner, having her premiere as his Lady Macbeth in 1747. He would later drop the play from his repertoire upon her retirement from the stage. Mrs. Pritchard was the first actress to achieve acclaim in the role of Lady Macbeth – at least partly due to the removal of Davenant's material, which made irrelevant moral contrasts with Lady Macduff. Garrick's portrayal focused on the inner life of the character, endowing him with an innocence vacillating between good and evil, and betrayed by outside influences. He portrayed a man capable of observing himself, as if a part of him remained untouched by what he had done, the play moulding him into a man of sensibility, rather than him descending into a tyrant.

John Philip Kemble first played Macbeth in 1778. Although usually regarded as the antithesis of Garrick, Kemble nevertheless refined aspects of Garrick's portrayal into his own. However it was the "towering and majestic" Sarah Siddons (Kemble's sister) who became a legend in the role of Lady Macbeth. In contrast to Hannah Pritchard's savage, demonic portrayal, Siddons' Lady Macbeth, while terrifying, was nevertheless – in the scenes in which she expresses her regret and remorse – tenderly human. And in portraying her actions as done out of love for her husband, Siddons deflected from him some of the moral responsibility for the play's carnage. Audiences seem to have found the sleepwalking scene particularly mesmerising: Hazlitt said of it that "all her gestures were involuntary and mechanical ... She glided on and off the stage almost like an apparition."

In 1794, Kemble dispensed with the ghost of Banquo altogether, allowing the audience to see Macbeth's reaction as his wife and guests see it, and relying upon the fact that the play was so well known that his audience would already be aware that a ghost enters at that point.

Ferdinand Fleck, notable as the first German actor to present Shakespeare's tragic roles in their fullness, played Macbeth at the Berlin National Theatre from 1787. Unlike his English counterparts, he portrayed the character as achieving his stature after the murder of Duncan, growing in presence and confidence: thereby enabling stark contrasts, such as in the banquet scene, which he ended babbling like a child.

Nineteenth century

Performances outside the patent theatres were instrumental in bringing the monopoly to an end. Robert Elliston, for example, produced a popular adaptation of Macbeth in 1809 at the Royal Circus described in its publicity as "this matchless piece of pantomimic and choral performance", which circumvented the illegality of speaking Shakespeare's words through mimed action, singing, and doggerel verse written by J. C. Cross.

In 1809, in an unsuccessful attempt to take Covent Garden upmarket, Kemble installed private boxes, increasing admission prices to pay for the improvements. The inaugural run at the newly renovated theatre was Macbeth, which was disrupted for over two months with cries of "Old prices!" and "No private boxes!" until Kemble capitulated to the protestors' demands.

Edmund Kean at Drury Lane gave a psychological portrayal of the central character, with a common touch, but was ultimately unsuccessful in the role. However he did pave the way for the most acclaimed performance of the nineteenth century, that of William Charles Macready. Macready played the role over a 30-year period, firstly at Covent Garden in 1820 and finally in his retirement performance. Although his playing evolved over the years, it was noted throughout for the tension between the idealistic aspects and the weaker, venal aspects of Macbeth's character. His staging was full of spectacle, including several elaborate royal processions.

In 1843 the Theatres Regulation Act finally brought the patent companies' monopoly to an end. From that time until the end of the Victorian era, London theatre was dominated by the actor-managers, and the style of presentation was "pictorial" – proscenium stages filled with spectacular stage-pictures, often featuring complex scenery, large casts in elaborate costumes, and frequent use of tableaux vivant. Charles Kean (son of Edmund), at London's Princess's Theatre from 1850 to 1859, took an antiquarian view of Shakespeare performance, setting his Macbeth in a historically accurate eleventh-century Scotland. His leading lady, Ellen Tree, created a sense of the character's inner life: The Times critic saying "The countenance which she assumed ... when luring on Macbeth in his course of crime, was actually appalling in intensity, as if it denoted a hunger after guilt." At the same time, special effects were becoming popular: for example in Samuel Phelps' Macbeth the witches performed behind green gauze, enabling them to appear and disappear using stage lighting.

In 1849, rival performances of the play sparked the Astor Place riot in Manhattan. The popular American actor Edwin Forrest, whose Macbeth was said to be like "the ferocious chief of a barbarous tribe" played the central role at the Broadway Theatre to popular acclaim, while the "cerebral and patrician" English actor Macready, playing the same role at the Astor Place Opera House, suffered constant heckling. The existing enmity between the two men (Forrest had openly hissed Macready at a recent performance of Hamlet in Britain) was taken up by Forrest's supporters – formed from the working class and lower middle class and anti-British agitators, keen to attack the upper-class pro-British patrons of the Opera House and the colonially-minded Macready. Nevertheless, Macready performed the role again three days later to a packed house while an angry mob gathered outside. The militia tasked with controlling the situation fired into the mob. In total, 31 rioters were killed and over 100 injured.

Charlotte Cushman is unique among nineteenth century interpreters of Shakespeare in achieving stardom in roles of both genders. Her New York debut was as Lady Macbeth in 1836, and she would later be admired in London in the same role in the mid-1840s. Helen Faucit was considered the embodiment of early-Victorian notions of femininity. But for this reason she largely failed when she eventually played Lady Macbeth in 1864: her serious attempt to embody the coarser aspects of Lady Macbeth's character jarred harshly with her public image. Adelaide Ristori, the great Italian actress, brought her Lady Macbeth to London in 1863 in Italian, and again in 1873 in an English translation cut in such a way as to be, in effect, Lady Macbeth's tragedy.

Henry Irving was the most successful of the late-Victorian actor-managers, but his Macbeth failed to curry favour with audiences. His desire for psychological credibility reduced certain aspects of the role: He described Macbeth as a brave soldier but a moral coward, and played him untroubled by conscience – clearly already contemplating the murder of Duncan before his encounter with the witches. Irving's leading lady was Ellen Terry, but her Lady Macbeth was unsuccessful with the public, for whom a century of performances influenced by Sarah Siddons had created expectations at odds with Terry's conception of the role.

Late nineteenth-century European Macbeths aimed for heroic stature, but at the expense of subtlety: Tommaso Salvini in Italy and Adalbert Matkowsky in Germany were said to inspire awe, but elicited little pity.

20th century to present

Two developments changed the nature of Macbeth performance in the 20th century: first, developments in the craft of acting itself, especially the ideas of Stanislavski and Brecht; and second, the rise of the dictator as a political icon. The latter has not always assisted the performance: it is difficult to sympathise with a Macbeth based on Hitler, Stalin, or Idi Amin.

Barry Jackson, at the Birmingham Repertory Theatre in 1923, was the first of the 20th-century directors to costume Macbeth in modern dress.

In 1936, a decade before his film adaptation of the play, Orson Welles directed Macbeth for the Negro Theatre Unit of the Federal Theatre Project at the Lafayette Theatre in Harlem, using black actors and setting the action in Haiti: with drums and Voodoo rites to establish the Witches scenes. The production, dubbed The Voodoo Macbeth, proved inflammatory in the aftermath of the Harlem riots, accused of making fun of black culture and as "a campaign to burlesque negroes" until Welles persuaded crowds that his use of black actors and voodoo made important cultural statements.

A performance which is frequently referenced as an example of the play's curse was the outdoor production directed by Burgess Meredith in 1953 in the British colony of Bermuda, starring Charlton Heston. Using the imposing spectacle of Fort St. Catherine as a key element of the set, the production was plagued by a host of mishaps, including Charlton Heston being burned when his tights caught fire.

The critical consensus is that there have been three great Macbeths on the English-speaking stage in the 20th century, all of them commencing at Stratford-upon-Avon: Laurence Olivier in 1955, Ian McKellen in 1976 and Antony Sher in 1999. Olivier's portrayal (directed by Glen Byam Shaw, with Vivien Leigh as Lady Macbeth) was immediately hailed as a masterpiece. Kenneth Tynan expressed the view that it succeeded because Olivier built the role to a climax at the end of the play, whereas most actors spend all they have in the first two acts.

The play caused grave difficulties for the Royal Shakespeare Company, especially at the (then) Shakespeare Memorial Theatre. Peter Hall's 1967 production was (in Michael Billington's words) "an acknowledged disaster" with the use of real leaves from Birnham Wood getting unsolicited first-night laughs, and Trevor Nunn's 1974 production was (Billington again) "an over-elaborate religious spectacle".

But Nunn achieved success for the RSC in his 1976 production at the intimate Other Place, with Ian McKellen and Judi Dench in the central roles. A small cast worked within a simple circle, and McKellen's Macbeth had nothing noble or likeable about him, being a manipulator in a world of manipulative characters. They were a young couple, physically passionate, "not monsters but recognisable human beings", but their relationship atrophied as the action progressed.

The RSC again achieved critical success in Gregory Doran's 1999 production at The Swan, with Antony Sher and Harriet Walter in the central roles, once again demonstrating the suitability of the play for smaller venues. Doran's witches spoke their lines to a theatre in absolute darkness, and the opening visual image was the entrance of Macbeth and Banquo in the berets and fatigues of modern warfare, carried on the shoulders of triumphant troops. In contrast to Nunn, Doran presented a world in which king Duncan and his soldiers were ultimately benign and honest, heightening the deviance of Macbeth (who seems genuinely surprised by the witches' prophecies) and Lady Macbeth in plotting to kill the king. The play said little about politics, instead powerfully presenting its central characters' psychological collapse.

Macbeth returned to the RSC in 2018, when Christopher Eccleston played the title role, with Niamh Cusack as his wife, Lady Macbeth. The play later transferred to the Barbican in London.

In Soviet-controlled Prague in 1977, faced with the illegality of working in theatres, Pavel Kohout adapted Macbeth into a 75-minute abridgement for five actors, suitable for "bringing a show in a suitcase to people's homes".

Spectacle was unfashionable in Western theatre throughout the 20th century. In East Asia, however, spectacular productions have achieved great success, including Yukio Ninagawa's 1980 production with Masane Tsukayama as Macbeth, set in the 16th century Japanese Civil War. The same director's tour of London in 1987 was widely praised by critics, even though (like most of their audience) they were unable to understand the significance of Macbeth's gestures, the huge Buddhist altar dominating the set, or the petals falling from the cherry trees.

Xu Xiaozhong's 1980 Central Academy of Drama production in Beijing made every effort to be unpolitical (necessary in the aftermath of the Cultural Revolution): yet audiences still perceived correspondences between the central character (whom the director had actually modelled on Louis Napoleon) and Mao Zedong. Shakespeare has often been adapted to indigenous theatre traditions, for example the Kunju Macbeth of Huang Zuolin performed at the inaugural Chinese Shakespeare Festival of 1986. Similarly, B. V. Karanth's Barnam Vana of 1979 had adapted Macbeth to the Yakshagana tradition of Karnataka, India. In 1997, Lokendra Arambam created Stage of Blood, merging a range of martial arts, dance and gymnastic styles from Manipur, performed in Imphal and in England. The stage was literally a raft on a lake.

Throne of Blood (蜘蛛巣城 Kumonosu-jō, Spider Web Castle) is a 1957 Japanese samurai film co-written and directed by Akira Kurosawa. The film transposes Macbeth from Medieval Scotland to feudal Japan, with stylistic elements drawn from Noh drama. Kurosawa was a fan of the play and planned his own adaptation for several years, postponing it after learning of Orson Welles' Macbeth (1948). The film won two Mainichi Film Awards.

The play has been translated and performed in various languages in different parts of the world, and Media Artists was the first to stage its Punjabi adaptation in India. The adaptation by Balram and the play directed by Samuel John have been universally acknowledged as a milestone in Punjabi theatre. The unique attempt involved trained theatre experts and the actors taken from a rural background in Punjab. Punjabi folk music imbued the play with the native ethos as the Scottish setting of Shakespeare's play was transposed into a Punjabi milieu.

In 2021, Saoirse Ronan starred in The Tragedy of Macbeth at the Almeida Theatre in London. The following year a revival production opened on Broadway with Daniel Craig and Ruth Negga to middling reviews.

See also
 Cultural references to Macbeth

Notes and references

Notes

References

All references to Macbeth, unless otherwise specified, are taken from the Arden Shakespeare, second series edition edited by Kenneth Muir. Under their referencing system, III.I.55 means act 3, scene 1, line 55. All references to other Shakespeare plays are to The Oxford Shakespeare Complete Works of Shakespeare edited by Stanley Wells and Gary Taylor.

Sources

Editions of Macbeth

Secondary sources

External links

 Macbeth, eds. Barbara Mowat, Paul Werstine, Michael Poston, and Rebecca Niles. Folger Shakespeare Library.
 Performances and Photographs from London and Stratford performances of Macbeth 1960–2000 – From the Designing Shakespeare resource
 
 "Macbeth" Complete Annotated Text on One Page Without Ads or Images
 Macbeth at the British Library
 Macbeth on Film
 PBS Video directed by Rupert Goold starring Sir Patrick Stewart
 Annotated Text at The Shakespeare Project – annotated HTML version of Macbeth.
 Macbeth Navigator – searchable, annotated HTML version of Macbeth.
 
 Macbeth Analysis and Textual Notes
 Annotated Bibliography of Macbeth Criticism
 Macbeth – full annotated text aligned to Common Core Standards
 Shakespeare and the Uses of Power by Steven Greenblatt

 
1603 plays
English Renaissance plays
Shakespearean tragedies
Regicides
Plays set in the 11th century
Plays set in Scotland
British plays adapted into films
Plays adapted into operas
Plays adapted into television shows
Plays based on real people
Fiction about suicide
Plays about Scottish royalty
Fiction about regicide
Witchcraft in written fiction